Opened in September 2006 by business partners Harlan Halper and Michael Palitz, Comix was a venue for stand-up comedy located in The Meatpacking District in New York City on 14th Street and 9th Avenue.  It was Zagat's top rated stand-up comedy club and was dubbed "one of the top six clubs in the country" by the Hollywood Reporter.  

Headliners that performed at Comix included Jim Breuer, Roseanne Barr, Craig Ferguson, Richard Lewis, Andy Borowitz, Kathy Griffin, Seth MacFarlane, Alex Borstein, Rosie O'Donnell, Sarah Silverman, John Oliver, Janeane Garofalo, Christian Finnegan, Brian Posehn, Jon Lovitz, David Cross and Flight of the Conchords. 

Its marketing and advertising campaign "Life's tough. Laugh more." was developed by Kambri Crews. The campaign consisted of several print ads that appeared in the New York City Subway and cable television and featured New Yorkers having a bad experience followed by laughing more at Comix.  She also created the  alternative performance space Ochi's Lounge. Located in the lower level of Comix, Ochi's Lounge regularly features open mics, produced shows and guest appearances by stars like Jim Gaffigan, Zach Galifianakis, Judah Friedlander, Pat Kiernan, and even Governor Mike Huckabee.

Comix closed on Saturday, February 12, 2011.

References

External links

Comix website
Ochi's Lounge page
 Comix on MySpace
Ochi's Lounge Facebook Page
Joe Lipari at Comix

Defunct comedy clubs in the United States
2006 establishments in New York City
2011 disestablishments in New York (state)